Sayyida Ruqayya may also refer to:

People
 Ruqayyah bint Muhammad, daughter of Muhammad
 Sayyida Ruqayya bint Ali, daughter of Ali ibn Abi Talib
 Ruqayyah bint Husayn, daughter of Husayn ibn Ali

Other uses
 Sayyidah Ruqayya Mosque, in Damascus, containing the grave of Rukayyah bint Husayn
 Mashhad of Sayyida Ruqayya, in Cairo, a memorial to Sayyida Ruqayya bint Ali

See also 
 Ruqayya